Huntington High School (HHS) is a public high school in Huntington, New York, United States. It is part of the Huntington Union Free School District.

Controversy  
In 2018, Huntington High School was at the center of a controversy surrounding the deportation of a Honduran student seeking asylum. Documented in the New York Times, Alex was wrongly accused by Huntington High School of being part of a gang. "Despite all these warning signs, when the ICE agents came to Alex's house on June 14, 2017, he was shocked into silence. It was only when they were far from Huntington, passing through unfamiliar, rundown Long Island towns, that he was able to get out the words to ask why he was being arrested. Alex says the agent first asked him to guess, and then told him, "We received a report a while ago from the school that you were a gang member, and that's why." 

Despite only comprising 9% of the students of the school, black students represent 33% of the school's out-of-school suspensions and 21% of expulsions. Furthermore, black students are 7.2 times more likely to see disciplinary action than white students are.

Notable alumni 
 Anthony Brown (1979), lawyer, politician and congressman
 James D. Conte, politician
 Brian Goldner (1981), CEO of Hasbro
 Leroy Grumman (1911), aeronautical engineer, test pilot, and industrialist
 Joseph Hazelwood (1964), sailor
 Amy Ignatow (1995), author, illustrator, and cartoonist
 Ilana Kurshan, author
 Greg Packer (1983), perpetual man-on-the-street interviewee
 Sarah Reinertsen, paratriathlete and former Paralympic track athlete
 Kurt Sohn (1975), NFL player

References

External links 
 

Huntington, New York
Schools in Suffolk County, New York
Public high schools in New York (state)
1958 establishments in New York (state)
Educational institutions established in 1958